Anna Záborská (born 7 June 1948 in Zürich) is a Slovak politician of the Christian Union party, living in Bojnice. From 2004 to 2019 she was a Member of the European Parliament, where she was a member of the Group of the European People's Party (EPP). She was a member of the Christian Democratic Movement party (KDH).

Personal life

Education 
From 1966 to 1972 she studied medicine at the Comenius University (Univerzita Komenského) in Martin, Slovakia (Turčiansky Svätý Martin).

Family
On 10 July 1972 she married the architect Vladimír Záborský; together they have two children: Veronika (*1973, living in Rome) and Eva (*1976, living in Bojnice).

Medical doctor
She worked from 1972 to 1998 as a medical doctor in Žilina, Béjaïa (Algeria) and Prievidza.

Political positions 
Záborská is known for having strong anti-abortion views. In 2020, she has proposed an anti-abortion bill to the National Council of the Slovak Republic, however, it did not pass.

In 2021, she voted to pass a proposal to amend the constitution, which would tie one's legal sex to that assigned at birth, effectively prohibiting transgender people from changing their legal sex. The bill would also amend the constitution to say that "parents are a father - a man, and a mother - woman."

Political career
Her political engagement was heavily influenced by her father, the medical doctor Anton Neuwirth (1921-2004), activist of Catholic Action, political prisoner, Member of Parliament, Presidential candidate, Honorary President of KDH and Ambassador.

In the Christian Democratic Movement (KDH) she served from 1999 to 2000 as vice-president for international relations. From 1998 to 2004 she was a member of the Slovak National Parliament "National Council" (Národná rada), where she worked primarily in the EU-Slovakia Joint Parliamentary Committee, which prepared the Slovak EU membership in 2004.

European Parliament 
In 2003 she was nominated as observer in the European Parliament (EP). In 2004 she was elected as Member of the European Parliament, where she was elected President of the EP Committee on Women's Rights and Gender Equality (2004-2009). During that legislature she was as well member of the EP Committee on Development (2004-2009) and member of the Delegation to the ACP-EU Joint Parliamentary Assembly (2004-2009).

In 2009 she was reelected to the EP. She stayed member of the EP Committee on Women's Rights and Gender Equality (2009-2014) and member of the EP Committee on Development (2009-2014), became in addition member of the EP Delegation for relations with Canada (2009-2014) and of the EP Special Committee on Organised Crime, Corruption and Money Laundering (2012-2014). In 2014 she was reelected to the EP. She stayed member of the EP Committee on Women's Rights and Gender Equality, member of the EP Committee on Development, member of the Delegation to the ACP-EU Joint Parliamentary Assembly and became in addition member of the EP Committee on Industry, Research and Energy.

Among others she was the rapporteur of the following EP reports: Women and poverty in the European Union (A6-0273/2005, 22 Sep 2005), Gender mainstreaming in the work of the committees (A6-0478/2006, 22 Dec 2006), Non-discrimination based on gender and intergenerational solidarity (A6-0492/2008, 10 Dec 2008), Gender mainstreaming in the work of its committees and delegations (A6-0198/2009, 02 Apr 2009).

Together with MEP :it:Tiziano Motti, she introduced in April 2010 an EP Written Declaration (P7_TA(2010)0247), which asked the EU Council of Ministers and the EU Commission to extend the Directive 2006/24/EC to make it possible to have an "early-warning system" on pedophilia. In June 2010 this text was adopted as official text of the EP after having been signed by 371 of 732 MEPs.

She is opposed to abortion. On 24 January 2011, she spoke at the March for Life in Washington, D.C. On 22 September 2013 she was the only politician invited to speak at the March for Life in Košice.

In September 2014 she nominated Louis Raphael I Sako (Chaldean Catholic Patriarch of Babylon) as candidate for the 2014 EP Human Rights Sakharov Prize.

National Council of the Slovak Republic 
Záborská is a member of the National Council of the Slovak Republic since the 2020 parliamentary election.

References

1948 births
Living people
Politicians from Zürich
Comenius University alumni
20th-century Slovak physicians
Slovak expatriates in Switzerland
Christian Democratic Movement MEPs
MEPs for Slovakia 2004–2009
MEPs for Slovakia 2009–2014
Women MEPs for Slovakia
MEPs for Slovakia 2014–2019
21st-century Slovak women politicians
21st-century Slovak politicians
Members of the National Council (Slovakia) 1998-2002
Members of the National Council (Slovakia) 2002-2006
Members of the National Council (Slovakia) 2020-present
Female members of the National Council (Slovakia)